The Ven.  Robert Breton, MA was  an eighteenth-century Anglican priest.

He was educated at Oriel College, Oxford. He was Archdeacon of Shropshire from 1738 to 1741; and Archdeacon of Hereford from 1741 until 1769.

Notes

Alumni of Oriel College, Oxford
Archdeacons of Shropshire
Archdeacons of Hereford